Nate Blouin (born 1989) is an American politician who represents Utah's 13th Senate District in the Utah State Senate.

Education and career 
Blouin received his associate's degree from Salt Lake Community College and his bachelor's degree from the University of Utah. He graduated from Brown University with a Master of Public Administration. Before being elected, Blouin worked with clean energy groups and environmental organizations to promote renewable energy.

Political career 
Blouin announced his candidacy for the Utah State Senate in 2022; his priorities included clean air and affordable housing. He won the Democratic primary against Gene Davis with nearly 76% of the vote. In the general election, he beat Republican Roger L. Stout with 72% of the vote.

References

External links 
Senator Blouin's page on the Utah Senate website

1989 births
Living people
21st-century American politicians
Democratic Party Utah state senators
Salt Lake Community College alumni
University of Utah alumni
Brown University alumni